The Nigretta Falls, previously known as the Upper Wannon Falls, are waterfalls located in the Southern Grampians Shire, approximately  west of Hamilton, Victoria, Australia. The falls are fed by the Wannon River that has its head waters in the Grampians mountains.

Location and features
In contrast to the single plunge of the Wannon Falls, Nigretta is a more interesting, multi-channel segmented cascade of smaller drops and bounces guided by patterns of joints in a much older (Devonian) rhyolitic volcanic rock. However, as with the Wannon Falls, the amount of water varies with the time of year - the photo shows a late winter, wet season, view. The Nigretta Scenic Reserve includes parts of the Wannon River Valley which contains representatives of the native plants of the Dundas Tablelands, listed in the reference.

See also

List of waterfalls of Victoria

References

External links 
 Parks Victoria: Grampians National Park

Waterfalls of Victoria (Australia)
Tourist attractions in Victoria (Australia)
Grampians (region)